This Commonwealth Games results index is a list of links which forms an index which can be used to quickly find the required Wikipedia page containing the results of each Commonwealth Games sport in any year of interest. Previously these games were known as The British Empire Games (1930-1950), The British Empire and Commonwealth Games (1954-1966) and The British Commonwealth Games (1970-1974).  Years appearing in red (or not highlighted) are those for which there is no corresponding article.

Archery
Overview
1930 1934
1938 1942
1946 1950
1954 1958
1962 1966
1970 1974
1978 1982
1986 1990
1994 1998
2002 2006
2010 2014
2018 2022

Athletics
Overview
1930 1934
1938 1942
1946 1950
1954 1958
1962 1966
1970 1974
1978 1982
1986 1990
1994 1998
2002 2006
2010 2014
2018 2022

Badminton
Overview
1930 1934
1938 1942
1946 1950
1954 1958
1962 1966
1970 1974
1978 1982
1986 1990
1994 1998
2002 2006
2010 2014
2018 2022

Basketball
Overview
1930 1934
1938 1942
1946 1950
1954 1958
1962 1966
1970 1974
1978 1982
1986 1990
1994 1998
2002 2006
2010 2014
2018 2022

Boxing
Overview
1930 1934
1938 1942
1946 1950
1954 1958
1962 1966
1970 1974
1978 1982
1986 1990
1994 1998
2002 2006
2010 2014
2018 2022

Cricket
Overview
1930 1934
1938 1942
1946 1950
1954 1958
1962 1966
1970 1974
1978 1982
1986 1990
1994 1998
2002 2006
2010 2014
2018 2022

Cycling
Overview
1930 1934
1938 1942
1946 1950
1954 1958
1962 1966
1970 1974
1978 1982
1986 1990
1994 1998
2002 2006
2010 2014
2018 2022

Diving
Overview
1930 1934
1938 1942
1946 1950
1954 1958
1962 1966
1970 1974
1978 1982
1986 1990
1994 1998
2002 2006
2010 2014
2018 2022

Fencing
Overview
1930 1934
1938 1942
1946 1950
1954 1958
1962 1966
1970 1974
1978 1982
1986 1990
1994 1998
2002 2006
2010 2014
2018 2022

Gymnastics
Overview
1930 1934
1938 1942
1946 1950
1954 1958
1962 1966
1970 1974
1978 1982
1986 1990
1994 1998
2002 2006
2010 2014
2018 2022

Hockey
Overview
1930 1934
1938 1942
1946 1950
1954 1958
1962 1966
1970 1974
1978 1982
1986 1990
1994 1998
2002 2006
2010 2014
2018 2022

Judo
Overview
1930 1934
1938 1942
1946 1950
1954 1958
1962 1966
1970 1974
1978 1982
1986 1990
1994 1998
2002 2006
2010 2014
2018 2022

Lawn bowls
Overview
1930 1934
1938 1942
1946 1950
1954 1958
1962 1966
1970 1974
1978 1982
1986 1990
1994 1998
2002 2006
2010 2014
2018 2022

Netball
Overview
1930 1934
1938 1942
1946 1950
1954 1958
1962 1966
1970 1974
1978 1982
1986 1990
1994 1998
2002 2006
2010 2014
2018 2022

Rowing
Overview
1930 1934
1938 1942
1946 1950
1954 1958
1962 1966
1970 1974
1978 1982
1986 1990
1994 1998
2002 2006
2010 2014
2018 2022

Rugby sevens
Overview
1930 1934
1938 1942
1946 1950
1954 1958
1962 1966
1970 1974
1978 1982
1986 1990
1994 1998
2002 2006
2010 2014
2018 2022

Shooting
Overview
1930 1934
1938 1942
1946 1950
1954 1958
1962 1966
1970 1974
1978 1982
1986 1990
1994 1998
2002 2006
2010 2014
2018 2022

Squash
Overview
1930 1934
1938 1942
1946 1950
1954 1958
1962 1966
1970 1974
1978 1982
1986 1990
1994 1998
2002 2006
2010 2014
2018 2022

Swimming
Overview
1930 1934
1938 1942
1946 1950
1954 1958
1962 1966
1970 1974
1978 1982
1986 1990
1994 1998
2002 2006
2010 2014
2018 2022

Synchronised swimming
Overview
1930 1934
1938 1942
1946 1950
1954 1958
1962 1966
1970 1974
1978 1982
1986 1990
1994 1998
2002 2006
2010 2014
2018 2022

Tennis
Overview
1930 1934
1938 1942
1946 1950
1954 1958
1962 1966
1970 1974
1978 1982
1986 1990
1994 1998
2002 2006
2010 2014
2018 2022

Triathlon
Overview
1930 1934
1938 1942
1946 1950
1954 1958
1962 1966
1970 1974
1978 1982
1986 1990
1994 1998
2002 2006
2010 2014
2018 2022

Weightlifting
Overview
1930 1934
1938 1942
1946 1950
1954 1958
1962 1966
1970 1974
1978 1982
1986 1990
1994 1998
2002 2006
2010 2014
2018 2022

Wrestling
Overview
1930 1934
1938 1942
1946 1950
1954 1958
1962 1966
1970 1974
1978 1982
1986 1990
1994 1998
2002 2006
2010 2014
2018 2022

See also